CJCB is a Canadian radio station broadcasting from Sydney, Nova Scotia at 1270 AM. The station is the third oldest radio station in Nova Scotia, hitting the airwaves on February 14, 1929. The station's current format is country. CJCB is the only commercial radio station in Canada to broadcast on 1270 AM. The station is owned and operated by the Maritime Broadcasting System, a company that owns several other radio stations in Nova Scotia, New Brunswick, and Prince Edward Island. CKPE-FM and CHER-FM are its sister stations. CJCB is the current broadcast partner of the Cape Breton Screaming Eagles hockey team of the QMJHL.

History
CJCB became an affiliate of CBC Radio when it launched in 1936. It was affiliated with the Trans-Canada Network until 1948, when it transferred its affiliation to the CBC's second network, the Dominion Network. When the Dominion Network dissolved in 1962, the station became independent.

CJCB played a wide variety of formats Adult Contemporary, Oldies, Top 40 etc., prior to switching formats with longtime country station CKPE-FM in June 1998 after MBS took over the stations. Over the years, CJCB used monikers such as "The Spirit of Cape Breton", "Cape Breton's Variety Station", "Cape Breton's Superstation", and "Cape Breton's Country Favorites".

Sister stations

CJCB-FM
CJCB added FM service with CJCB-FM 94.9 signing on in 1957. In 1981, CJCB-FM became CKPE-FM.

CJCB-TV
CJCB added TV service on October 9, 1954, with the debut of CJCB-TV. The station was sold in 1971.

CJCX
From 1938 to 1976, CJCB was broadcast on shortwave radio under the call sign CJCX at 6.01 MHz.

An earlier CJCB
CJCB was formerly the callsign of a radio station in Nelson, British Columbia that operated in 1923–24.

References

External links
 CJCB AM 1270
 
 

JCB
JCB
JCB
Radio stations established in 1929
1929 establishments in Nova Scotia
JCB
Shortwave radio stations in Canada